Polymixis polymita is a moth of the family Noctuidae. It is found in most of Europe, but not in the Benelux, Britain, Ireland and the Iberian Peninsula.

The wingspan is 39–46 mm. Adults are on wing from August to October. There is one generation per year.

The larvae feed on Primula, Lamium, Chaerophyllum and other low growing plants.

External links

Fauna Europaea
Lepiforum.de

Cuculliinae
Moths of Europe
Moths of Asia
Taxa named by Carl Linnaeus